The second cabinet of Petru Groza was the government of Romania from 1 December 1946 to 30 December 1947. This was the last government of the Kingdom of Romania.

Ministers
The ministers of the cabinet were as follows:

President of the Council of Ministers:
Petru Groza (1 December 1946 - 29 December 1947)
Vice President of the Council of Ministers:
Gheorghe Tătărăscu (1 December 1946 - 5 November 1947)
Minister of the Interior:
Teohari Georgescu (1 December 1946 - 29 December 1947)
Minister of Foreign Affairs:
Gheorghe Tătărăscu (1 December 1946 - 5 November 1947)
Ana Pauker (5 November - 29 December 1947)
Minister of Justice:
Lucrețiu Pătrășcanu (1 December 1946 - 29 December 1947)
Minister of War:
Gen. Mihail Lascăr (1 December 1946 - 5 November 1947)
Emil Bodnăraș (5 November - 29 December 1947)
Minister of Finance:
Alexandru Alexandrini (1 December 1946 - 5 November 1947)
Vasile Luca (5 November - 29 December 1947)
Minister of Agriculture and Property:
Traian Săvulescu (1 December 1946 - 29 December 1947)
Minister of National Economy:
Gheorghe Gheorghiu-Dej (1 December 1946 - 29 December 1947)
Minister of Mines and Petroleum:
Tudor Ionescu (1 December 1946 - 29 December 1947)
Minister of Communications:
Nicolae Profiri (1 December 1946 - 29 December 1947)
Minister of Public Works:
Ion Gh. Vântu (1 December 1946 - 5 November 1947)
Theodor Iordăchescu (5 November - 29 December 1947)
Minister of Cooperation:
Romulus Zăroni (1 December 1946 - 29 December 1947)
Minister of Labour and Social Insurance:
Lothar Rădăceanu (1 December 1946 - 29 December 1947)
Minister of Health:
Florica Bagdasar  (1 December 1946 - 29 December 1947)
Minister of National Education:
Ștefan Voitec (1 December 1946 - 29 December 1947)
Minister of Information:
Octav Livezeanu (1 December 1946 - 29 December 1947)
Minister of Religious Affairs:
Radu Roșculeț (1 December 1946 - 5 November 1947)
Stanciu Stoian (5 November - 29 December 1947)
Minister of the Arts:
Ion Pas (1 December 1946 - 29 December 1947)

References

Cabinets of Romania
Cabinets established in 1946
Cabinets disestablished in 1947
1946 establishments in Romania
1947 disestablishments in Romania